The Bold Ones: The New Doctors (also known as The New Doctors) is an American medical drama that lasted for four seasons on NBC, from 1969 to 1973.

Overview

The series focuses on the life of Dr. David Craig (E. G. Marshall), an extremely successful neurosurgeon who is so renowned in his field that he is able to open his own very exclusive clinic called The David Craig Institute of New Medicine.

Craig has enlisted two "bold" young medical executives, chief of surgery Dr. Ted Stuart (John Saxon) and Paul Hunter (David Hartman). The character Dr. Stuart was later replaced by Dr. Cohen (Robert Walden).

The New Doctors was part of The Bold Ones, a rotating series of dramas that also included The Protectors (with Leslie Nielsen), The Lawyers (with Burl Ives) and The Senator (with Hal Holbrook). The New Doctors was the only one of the four series to last for the entire run.

David Hartman was nominated for a Golden Globe Award for portraying Paul Hunter on this show.

Synopsis
Together with his two assistants Dr. Paul Hunter and Dr. Ted Stuart, Dr. David Craig encounters an array of medical and psychosocial issues in his own exclusive clinic. The clinic utilizes then "cutting edge" treatments and is at the forefront of medical research. Medical cases cover a broad spectrum, including organ transplants, mothers with post-partum depression, patients with psychogenic problems, and patients that are difficult to communicate with.
Episodes were 60 minutes, and in some cases, Craig becomes involved with patients stricken with rare diseases and unusual circumstances as occurred in later medical dramas such as House and ER.

The closing credits state that "the story, techniques and equipment shown are based on actual developments at the frontiers of medicine."

Cast and characters
 E. G. Marshall as Dr. David Craig, a successful neurosurgeon who has opened his own exclusive clinic called The David Craig Institute of New Medicine.
 John Saxon as Dr. Ted Stuart, the chief of surgery at the clinic (seasons one through three).
 David Hartman as Dr. Paul Hunter, the chief of medicine at the clinic.
 Robert Walden as  Dr. Martin Cohen (replaced John Saxon from episode four of season four).
 Julie Adams as  Mrs. Lynn Craig, Dr. David Craig's wife (season two only).

Episodes

After the pilot episode, "To Save a Life", the series became a hit, lasting for three more seasons, ending with the 15th episode of fourth season, "And Other Things I May Not See".

The episode "Five Days in the Death of Sgt. Brown" was a crossover with Ironside; that episode started in Ironside and ended in New Doctors. Both parts were syndicated as Ironside episodes, using the opening and closing credits from part one.

Home media
On March 1, 2016, Timeless Media Group released The Bold Ones: The New Doctors- The Complete Series on DVD in Region 1.

Guest appearances
 Norma Crane made two appearances playing different roles in the episodes: A Threatened Species and Crisis.
 Linda Dangcil also made two appearances playing different roles in the episodes: A Matter of Priorities and To Save a Life.
 Clu Gulager as Dan Corwin/Matt Smith in the episodes: End Theme and A Threatened Species
 Pat Hingle as Dr. Ben Gold and Walsh in the episodes: Glass Cage and To Save a Life
 Darby Hinton as Hal Parker in This Will Really Kill You
 Ron Howard as a fourteen-year-old who discovers that his father is homosexual in Discovery at Fourteen
 Sheila Larken as Liz in the episodes: A Substitute Womb and This Day's Child
 Joanne Linville as Anne Sorenson/Joan Stedman in the episodes: Time Bomb in the Chest and In Dreams They Run
 Tisha Sterling as Casey Woods/Joan in the episodes: This Will Really Kill You and What's the Price of a Pair of Eyes?
 Jane Wyman as Dr. Amanda Fallon in the episodes: And Other Things I May Not See and Discovery at Fourteen

References

External links

The Bold Ones: The New Doctors at TVIV

1969 American television series debuts
1973 American television series endings
1960s American medical television series
1970s American medical television series
1960s American drama television series
1970s American drama television series
NBC original programming
Television series by Universal Television
Television series created by Steven Bochco